Kissology Volume One: 1974–1977 is a DVD/Home Video released by the hard rock band Kiss on October 31, 2006. It contains two discs, plus one of three separate bonus discs sold only within initial first pressings. Also included with the DVD set is a 20-page color booklet, with commentary on each portion of the DVD. Some versions of this DVD have a replica of Kiss's "Spring Tour '75" backstage pass as an iron-on.

As a promotional effort for Kissology Volume One, National CineMedia presented a one-night screening of selected portions of the DVD at a limited number of theaters on October 26, 2006. The screening began with an introductory interview with Gene Simmons and Paul Stanley, and included the documentary of Kiss's 1975 trip to Cadillac, Michigan, as well as a 1976 Cobo Arena concert (both from Disc 1). The set was certified 5× platinum by the RIAA in the US.

Track listing

Disc 1

Disc 2

Bonus Disc (Best Buy)

Bonus Disc (Amazon and other major retailers)

Bonus Disc (Wal-Mart)

Certifications

References

2006 live albums
2006 video albums
Kiss (band) video albums
Live video albums